The 2014 ABL Playoffs is the postseason of the 2014 ABL Regular Season. The regular season begins on 16 July 2014 and end 26 October 2014. The playoffs will begin in November 2014, with the top four teams (out of six).

All playoffs series are in a best-of-three format.

Bracket

All times in UTC+8.

Semifinals

Malaysia vs. Saigon

Bangkok vs. Singapore

Finals

References

External links
 The official website of the Asean Basketball League

Playoffs
ASEAN Basketball League playoffs